Erna Roth-Oberth (born 27 February 1922 in Schäßburg (Sighișoara), Transylvania; died 23 August 2012 in Feucht was a Transylvanian-German lawyer, a daughter of Hermann Oberth. From 1953, she worked as a lawyer, assisted her father in completing his business affairs and in publishing his works. In 1969, she co-founded the Salzburg International Space Agency, Hermann Oberth - Wernher von Braun (IFR) in Salzburg, and was its vice president for many years. In 1971, together with her husband Josef Roth, she founded the Hermann Oberth Space Museum (HORM) in Feucht near Nuremberg with the aim of illustrating the development of space technology.

References

2012 deaths
1922 births
German women lawyers
20th-century German lawyers
20th-century women lawyers
20th-century German women
Romanian emigrants to Germany